The House of Sabah ( Āl Ṣubāḥ) is the ruling family of Kuwait.

History

Origin
The Al Sabah family originate from the Bani Utbah confederation. Prior to settling in Kuwait, the Al Sabah family were expelled from Umm Qasr in southern Iraq by the Ottomans due to their predatory habits of preying on caravans in Basra and trading ships in Shatt al-Arab. According to one oral tradition, the Al Sabah family settled across various regions in southern Iran and Iraq, until they finally settled in what is now Kuwait around the early 1700s. According to another oral tradition, told to the Political Agent by Shaikh Abdulla, the Sabahs fled drought in central Arabia in 1710. They migrated south, but finding conditions still bleaker, returned and now with other families migrated to Zubara, on Qatar's west coast. Conditions there were no better so they migrated again, this time north to Kuwait where, finding water, they settled. On the last leg of the journey that had atabu-ila al-shimal (moved to the north). And that, according to one tradition, was the origin of the name Bani Utub. Soon after founding a settlement in Kuwait, a Sabah became leader, ruling until his death in 1762.

Mubarak the Great
The reign of Mubarak the Great (1896-1915) forged the critical alliance between Kuwait and Britain. In the late 19th century, resurgent Ottoman power coupled with rising Al-Saud power drew Kuwait closer to the Ottomans. This began to change as the century closed. When Sheikh Mohammed came to power in 1892, disagreements soon arose between him and his brother Mubarak. Muhammad dealt with this by busying Mubarak with affairs outside the capital. In 1896 he summoned his sons, Jabir and Salim, and some supporters and rode to Kuwait, secretly entering Muhammed's house. There he killed Muhammed and his brother Jarrah. In the morning, Mubarak announced that his brothers had died, and that he ruled in their stead.

Sheikh Abdullah Al-Salim
Sheikh Abdullah Al-Salim Al-Sabah ended the British protectorate status of Kuwait by signing a treaty with the British on 19 June 1961.  He introduced the Constitution of Kuwait in 1962, followed by the Parliament in 1963.

Gulf War
During the Gulf War, the Emir of Kuwait Sheikh Jaber Al- Ahmed Al-Sabah and his government ran the exiled government from a hotel in Ta'if, Saudi Arabia.

From Ta'if, Sheikh Jaber set up his government so that its ministers were in communication with the people still in Kuwait. The government was able to direct an underground armed resistance made up of both military and civilian forces and was able to provide public services to the Kuwaiti people who remained, such as emergency care through the funds that it had saved from oil revenues. In the meantime, Sheikh Jaber and his government lobbied to receive military support action against Iraq before and during the Gulf War. When the war ended on 28 February 1991, Sheikh Jaber remained in Saudi Arabia while declaring three months of martial law.

By imposing martial law, government officials were able to ensure that there were no Iraqis still in Kuwait who may have attempted to once again overthrow the government. They were also tasked with making sure that the country was safe enough for Sheikh Jaber and his government to return, which they eventually did on 15 March 1991.

Public feuds 
Kuwaiti political scientist Mohammed Alwuhaib has argued that "members of the Al Sabah [have] interfered in and manipulated political and economic factions as a tool to weaken each other, with allegations of corruption a particularly common tactic."

In August 2011, supporters of Sheikh Ahmed Al-Fahad Al-Ahmed Al-Sabah "discovered" documents that incriminated up to one-third of Kuwaiti politicians in what quickly became the largest political corruption scandal in Kuwaiti history. By October 2011, 16 Kuwaiti politicians were alleged to have received payments of $350m in return for their support of government policy.

In December 2013, allies of Sheikh Ahmad Al-Fahad claimed to possess tapes purportedly showing that Sheikh Nasser Al-Mohammed Al-Sabah and Jassem Al-Kharafi were discussing plans to topple the Kuwaiti government. Sheikh Ahmad Al-Fahad appeared on local channel Al-Watan TV describing his claims.

In April 2014 the Kuwaiti government imposed a total media blackout to ban any reporting or discussion on the issue. In March 2015, Kuwait's public prosecutor dropped all investigations into the alleged coup plot and Sheikh Ahmad Al-Fahad read a public apology on Kuwait state television renouncing the coup allegations. Since then, "numerous associates of his have been targeted and detained by the Kuwaiti authorities on various charges," most notably members of the so-called "Fintas Group" that had allegedly been the original circulators of the fake coup video.

In December 2015, Sheikh Ahmad Al-Fahad was convicted of "disrespect to the public prosecutor and attributing a remark to the country's ruler without a special permission from the emir's court," issuing a suspended six-month prison sentence and a fine of 1,000 Kuwaiti Dinar. In January 2016, the Kuwaiti appeals court overturned the prior ruling and cleared Sheikh Ahmad Al-Fahad of all charges.

In November 2018, Sheikh Ahmad Al-Fahad, along with four other defendants, were charged in Switzerland with forgery related to the fake coup video. Shortly thereafter, Sheikh Ahmad Al-Fahad temporarily stepped aside from his role at the International Olympic Committee, pending an ethics committee hearing into the allegations. In August 2021, Sheikh Ahmed attended court alongside three of the other four defendants. In September 2021, Sheikh Ahmed was convicted of forgery along with the four other defendants. He denied wrongdoing and plans to appeal.

In November 2019, former deputy prime minister and minister of interior Sheikh Khaled Al Jarrah Al Sabah was dismissed from office after minister of defense Sheikh Nasser Sabah Al Ahmed Al Sabah filed a complaint with the Kuwaiti Attorney General alleging embezzlement of 240 million Kuwaiti dinars ($794.5 million) of Kuwait government funds had taken place during Khaled's tenure as minister of defense. In July 2020, the US Department of Justice filed an asset forfeiture claim against The Mountain Beverly Hills and other real property in the United States, alleging a group of three Kuwaiti officials, including Sheikh Khaled Al Jarrah, set up unauthorized accounts in the name of the country's Military Attache Office in London, known as the 'Army Fund.' They allegedly funded the accounts with over $100m of Kuwaiti public money and used it for their own purposes. In March 2021, the Kuwaiti ministerial court ordered the detention of Khaled Al Jarrah, who was arrested and imprisoned.

On April 13, 2021, a Kuwaiti court ordered the detention of former prime minister Sheikh Jaber Al-Mubarak Al-Hamad Al-Sabah on corruption charges related to the 'Army Fund.' He is the first former Kuwaiti prime minister to face pre-trial detention over graft charges. The crimes allegedly took place during Jaber Al-Sabah's 2001–11 term as defense minister.

Rulers
 1st Ruler:  Sheikh Sabah I bin Jaber: 1752–1762
 2nd Ruler:  Sheikh Abdullah I: 1762–1814
 3rd Ruler:  Sheikh Jaber I: 1814–1859
 4th Ruler:  Sheikh Sabah II: 1859–1866
 5th Ruler:  Sheikh Abdallah II: 1866–1892
 6th Ruler:  Sheikh Muhammad Al-Sabah: 1892–1896
 7th Ruler:  Sheikh Mubarak Al-Sabah: 1896–1915
 8th Ruler:  Sheikh Jaber II: 1915–1917
 9th Ruler:  Sheikh Salim Al-Mubarak Al-Sabah: 1917–1921
 10th Ruler: Sheikh Ahmad Al-Jaber Al-Sabah: 1921–1950
 11th Ruler 1st Emir Sheikh Abdullah Al-Salim Al-Sabah: 1950–1965
 12th Ruler 2nd Emir Sheikh Sabah Al-Salim Al-Sabah: 1965–1977
 13th Ruler 3rd Emir Sheikh Jaber Al-Ahmad Al-Sabah: 1977–2006
 14th Ruler 4th Emir Sheikh Saad Al-Abdullah Al-Salim Al-Sabah: 15–29 January 2006
 15th Ruler 5th Emir Sheikh Sabah Al-Ahmad Al-Jaber Al-Sabah: 2006–2020
 16th Ruler 6th Emir Sheikh Nawaf Al-Ahmad Al-Jaber Al-Sabah: 2020–present

Dean of the House
Chieftain, Sheikh Salem Al-Ali Al-Sabah (b. 1926)

Governing branches
Chieftain Sheikhs of the House of Sabah have been leading the Military of Kuwait since the early establishment of defense infantry and cavalry forces. Since the forming of the first cabinet on 17 January 1962, all three of the defense ministry, interior ministry and ministry of foreign affairs of Kuwait have been led by members of the House of Sabah.<ref name=kuna11>{{cite news|title=Nine ministers headed Interior Ministry since Kuwaits independence|url=http://www.kuna.net.kw/ArticleDetails.aspx?id=2143274&language=en|access-date=15 September 2013|work=KUNA|date=7 February 2011}}</ref> 

Lineage

See also
Government of Kuwait
Politics of Kuwait

References

External links
kuwait-info.comAl Sabah: History and Genealogy of Kuwait’s Ruling Family 1752-1987 by Alan Rush (Ithaca Press, 1987)Burke’s Ruling Families of the World, Volume 2 (Burke’s Peerage, 1980), includes genealogies and essays on Al-Sabah (Kuwait)Records of Kuwait'' ed., Alan Rush (8 vols. Archive Editions, 1989)

Arab dynasties
 
S